The 1920 Texas Mines Miners football team was an American football team that represented the Texas School of Mines (now known as the University of Texas at El Paso) as an independent during the 1920 college football season.  The team was coached by Harry Van Surdam who was later inducted into the College Football Hall of Fame.  The team compiled a 2–4 record and was outscored by a total of 191 to 48.

Schedule

References

Texas Mines
UTEP Miners football seasons
Texas Mines Miners football